Uncle Joe is a 1941 American film directed by Howard M. Railsback and Raymond E. Swartley.

Plot
When big city girl Clare Day starts seeing a modernistic artist of whom her father disapproves, she is sent to visit her mother's brother Joe in rural "Baysville", Iowa. The four boys who live next door to Uncle Joe remember Clare as a skinny little girl and are shocked by how grown-up she has become. Eagerly, they all vie for her attention. Uncle Joe himself is stuck in a romance of the past and fails to hear that his sweetheart Julia Jordan is going to lose her house if she can't pay the mortgage. Clare and Bill, one of the four fellows next door, construct a means to save the day.

Cast 

Slim Summerville as Uncle Joe
Zasu Pitts as Aunt Julia
Gale Storm as Clare
William Davidson as J.K. Day
Dorothy Peterson as Margaret Day
Dick Hogan as Bill
Frank Coghlan, Jr. as Dick
James Butler as Bob
Maynard Holmes as Skinny
Brenda Henderson as Ann
Howard Hickman as Banker Jones
John Holland as Paul Darcey

Uncredited (in order of appearance)

Cast notes
Uncle Joe was the 13th of 14 features that starred or co-starred the screen team of Slim Summerville and Zasu Pitts. They had no scenes together in their first film, the silent version of All Quiet on the Western Front, and supporting roles in the next three films, but were starred in their fifth feature, 1932's The Unexpected Father, with their names and faces on the poster indicating their above-the-title status. Over the following 16 months in 1932–1934, they starred in five additional features for Universal and one more, also in 1934, for RKO. During the next seven years they continued steadily appearing in separate features and were reteamed for their final three films, including Uncle Joe, in 1941. 
  
Gale Storm began her screen career at the age of 18 with minor roles in two 1940 films. The following year she appeared in seven features, including Uncle Joe. With the exception of 1944, she was seen in films released every year through 1952, for a total of 35 features, moving at that point to television as the sitcom star of My Little Margie in 1952 and The Gale Storm Show in 1956.

Uncle Joe was her eighth feature and she received third billing, behind Slim Summerville and Zasu Pitts. Fifteen years later, she was reteamed with Zasu Pitts for the 126-episode 1956–1960 run of The Gale Storm Show in which she played an ocean liner cruise director, with Pitts as the ship's manicurist who is continually talked into becoming the reluctant participant in her adventures and accomplice in her schemes to outwit the ship's irritable captain.

References

External links 

1941 films
1941 musical comedy films
American musical comedy films
American black-and-white films
Monogram Pictures films
1940s English-language films
1940s American films